St Andrews is a town in Victoria, Australia, 52 km north-east of Melbourne's Central Business District, located within the Shire of Nillumbik local government area. St Andrews recorded a population of 1,186 at the 2021 census.

St Andrews is well known for its alternative market, which is open every Saturday from 8am to 2pm it is closed on total fire ban days however. It also contains a hotel, primary school, bakery, CFA, general store and the Wadambuk community centre where a mobile library managed by Yarra Plenty Regional Library has a regular scheduled stop.

History
Originally called Queenstown, the area was surveyed in 1858 and a town proclaimed on 25 February 1861. Located between Panton Hill and Kinglake, by 1865 it was also known as St Andrews, and the presence of large numbers of Scottish miners gave rise to the town being called both ‘Caledonia’ and ‘St Andrews’.

St Andrew Post Office had opened earlier on 1 January 1856 and was renamed St Andrews in 1923.

It experienced population growth during the Victorian gold rush, when prospectors mined the hills around the town. St Andrews was the earliest goldfield in the area and by1855 there were 3000 miners. The first discovery of gold in Queenstown was recorded in The Herald on 9 and 11 March 1855 and was attributed to a George Boston and two Scotsmen.

In April 2015, it was named Victoria's Wealthiest Town, as a result of ATO statistics. The town beat Toorak and Portsea, traditional leaders in this ranking.

St Andrews has a great community feel and is much loved by its residents and visitors alike.

Bushfires
On 7 February 2009 a major bushfire destroyed houses on Ninks, Muller, Jacksons and Wild Dog Creek Roads, as well as Buttermans Track and Olives Lane. Its progression toward the town centre was halted by a southerly wind change, which saved the rest of the town, but drove the fire front further east, destroying the towns of Kinglake and Marysville.

Notable residents 
Ross Noble
Reg Evans

See also
 Shire of Eltham – St Andrews was previously within this former local government area.

References

External links
St Andrews Queenstown Historical Society
Victoria's wealthiest town? St Andrews remains rich in community spirit
St Andrews the highest earning postcode in Victoria, beating Toorak and Portsea
St Andrews Community Market

Towns in Victoria (Australia)
Mining towns in Victoria (Australia)
Shire of Nillumbik